Presidente Pinto was a  protected cruiser of the Chilean Navy. She was built, like her sister ship, the protected cruiser , in France supervised by Juan José Latorre. The ships were ordered in 1887 by President José Manuel Balmaceda before the beginning of the 1891 Chilean Civil War.

During the war, the two cruisers lay incomplete in French dockyards alongside the pre-dreadnought battleship . If these had been secured by the Balmacedists the naval supremacy of the congress would have been seriously challenged. The congressional forces formally requested that the ships be detained. None of the three ships were involved in the Civil War.

Presidente Pinto was launched and sailed to Chile on 5 August 1891, before having been completed. Her artillery was supplied from an English merchant in the North Sea while transiting to Chile.

Her voyage to Chile saw some trouble, forced to return to Le Havre in order to pick up crew and insubordination of the crew. She arrived to Valparaíso in September 1892, too late to participate in the Civil War.

The engines had to be repaired because of the improper conditioning during the voyage to Chile.

In 1902, during the Thousand Days' War, the Colombian Government tried unsuccessfully to purchase Presidente Pinto.

See also
 South American dreadnought race
 List of decommissioned ships of the Chilean Navy

References

External links
 Chilean Navy website, Crucero Presidente Pinto
 Presidente Pinto covered by "Conway's All The World's Fighting Ships 1860-1905"

Presidente Errázuriz-class cruisers
1890 ships